Cristina Cuba (born June 4, 1996 in Lima, Peru) is a Peruvian volleyball player who plays as setter for the Peru national team. Cristina was part of the team that won gold at the 2012 Youth South American Championship, the first gold medal for Peruvian volleyball in that category after 32 years and the first gold in any category in 19 years.

Clubs
  Sporting Cristal (2011–2013)
  Club Regatas Lima (2013–present)

Awards

Individuals
 2012 Liga Nacional Juvenil de Voleibol Femenino "Best Server"

National team

Junior team
 2011 U16 South American Championship -  Silver Medal
 2012 Junior South American Championship -  Silver Medal
 2012 Youth South American Championship -  Gold Medal

References

1996 births
Living people
Sportspeople from Lima
Peruvian women's volleyball players
21st-century Peruvian women